Maria "Ria" Ahlers (married Steenpaal) (born 20 July 1954) is a former high jumper from the Netherlands. She competed in the 1972 and 1976 Summer Olympics and finished in 16th and 12th place, respectively. Her personal best was 1.87 m (1976). She was a national champion in 1972, 1972 and 1976.

References

External links
Ria AHLERS. les-sports.info

1954 births
Living people
Athletes (track and field) at the 1972 Summer Olympics
Athletes (track and field) at the 1976 Summer Olympics
Dutch female high jumpers
Olympic athletes of the Netherlands
Sportspeople from Groningen (city)